Kevin Rivers may refer to:

 Kevin Rivers (songwriter) (born 1987), American songwriter and entrepreneur
 Kevin Rivers (beach volleyball), beach volleyball and volleyball player from Trinidad and Tobago